Riama cashcaensis, Kizorian's lightbulb lizard, is a species of lizard in the family Gymnophthalmidae. It is endemic to Ecuador.

References

Riama
Reptiles of Ecuador
Endemic fauna of Ecuador
Reptiles described in 1991
Taxa named by David A. Kizirian
Taxa named by Luis Aurelio Coloma